Zombie Fighters (or Kud Krachak Krien) is a 2017 Thai horror-comedy film directed by Poj Arnon and it is the first Thai zombie film. The film stars Bhuvadol Vejvongsa, Kittipat Samantrakulchai, Korakrit Laotrakul, Worrachai Sirikongsuwan, Supakit Thinjun and Pasakorn Sanrattana.

Synopsis
Audy and his gang head to the deserted hospital where his parents went and never came back to them. He really likes to know what happens there and why the hospital was abandoned. After sneaking in there, he and his gang found out the terrible of something in the hospital and trapped in there. 
Lambo, Audy's brother, picked up the younger brother's phone calling, he is shock when his brother call out to save him at the deserted hospital, so he bring his nerd brother, Cooper and his friends such as Otto, Krasoon and Bas accompany to help him save his brother and then they find out that his youngest brother was trapped among zombies which caused from the virus plagues in there. How Lambo and his gang can save his brother and survived from the zombies?

Cast
 Bhuvadol Vejvongsa as Lambo
 Kittipat Samantrakulchai as Cooper
 Korakrit Laotrakul as Audy
 Worrachai Sirikongsuwan as Otto
 Supakit Thinjun as Krasoon
 Pasakorn Sanrattana as Bas

References

External links
 http://www.gscmovies.com.my/zombie-fighters/
 Kud Krachak Krien at the Internet Movie Database
 https://www.instagram.com/zombiefighters_/

Thai comedy horror films
Films directed by Poj Arnon